The gastrin-releasing peptide receptor (GRPR), now properly known as BB2  is a G protein-coupled receptor whose endogenous ligand is gastrin releasing peptide. In humans it is highly expressed in the pancreas and is also expressed in the stomach, adrenal cortex and brain.

Gastrin-releasing peptide (GRP) regulates numerous functions of the gastrointestinal and central nervous systems, including release of gastrointestinal hormones, smooth muscle cell contraction, and epithelial cell proliferation and is a potent mitogen for neoplastic tissues. The effects of GRP are mediated through the gastrin-releasing peptide receptor. This receptor is a glycosylated, 7-transmembrane G-protein coupled receptor that activates the phospholipase C signaling pathway. The receptor is aberrantly expressed in numerous cancers such as those of the lung, colon, and prostate. An individual with autism and multiple exostoses was found to have a balanced translocation between chromosome 8 and a chromosome X breakpoint located within the gastrin-releasing peptide receptor gene.

The transcription factor CREB is a regulator of human GRP-R expression in colon cancer.

Activation MOR1D‐GRPR heteromers in the spinal cord mediate the common troublesome opioid-induced itch.

References

Further reading

External links
 
IUPHAR GPCR Database - BB2 receptor
 

G protein-coupled receptors